Ismail "Baboo" Ebrahim (5 November 1946 – 18 July 2020) was a South African cricketer.

A slow left-arm orthodox spin bowler, Ebrahim played 48 first-class matches and two List A matches, mostly for Natal, between 1971 and 1984. He played in the Dadabhay Trophy tournament for non-white cricketers until the 1977–78 season, when he represented Natal B in the Castle Bowl, the second division of "white" first-class cricket, and would go on to play in the Currie Cup in the 1978–79 season.

In addition to playing in the previously exclusively white Currie Cup, Ebrahim was one of several non-white cricketers to join white cricket clubs in the 1970s in spite of the apartheid laws that existed during his cricket career. He also represented Radcliffe in the Central Lancashire Cricket League for one season.

Ebrahim was selected to play for the South African Invitational XI against the International Wanderers in 1976. He returned match figures of 6 for 66, and claimed the wickets of Greg Chappell and Mike Denness. He later represented South Africa in Masters cricket events.

Ebrahim died in Durban on 18 July 2020.

References

External links
 

1946 births
2020 deaths
South African cricketers
KwaZulu-Natal cricketers
Cricketers from Durban